The 2014 Torneio Internacional de Brasília de Futebol Feminino (also known as the 2014 International Tournament of Brasilia) is an invitational football tournament held every December in Brazil. The 2014 tournament ran from December 10–21, 2014.

Tournament rules allow a 23-member roster. Players marked (c) were named as captain for their national squad. Totals for caps and goals, club affiliations, and ages are as of the opening day of the tournament on 10 December 2014.

Squads

Coach: Julio Olarticoechea

The Argentine Football Association (AFA) announced a list of 20 players who would travel to Brazil.

Coach: Vadão

The Brazilian Football Confederation (CBF) announced a squad of 23 players on 8 December 2014.

Coach: Hao Wei

Coach: Jill Ellis

References

External links
  (Portuguese)

2014 in women's association football
Torn
2014 squads
2014